Kamakura Museum may refer to:
Museum of Modern Art, Kamakura & Hayama
Museum of Modern Art, Kamakura & Hayama, Annex
Kamakura Museum of Literature
Kamakura Museum of National Treasures
Kawakita Memorial Film Institute